Cephalalgia may refer to:
 Headache, pain in the region of the head or neck
 Cephalalgia (journal), a medical journal of the International Headache Society